Paul James Kane (born 20 June 1965 in Edinburgh) is a Scottish former professional footballer who played mainly for Hibernian, Aberdeen and St Johnstone.

Club career
A midfielder, Kane began his career with Hibernian in 1982. In eight years at Easter Road he made 292 total appearances and scored 42 goals, and played on the losing side in the 1985 Scottish League Cup Final, aged 20. In January 1991 he joined Oldham Athletic and went on to make 21 appearances for the Boundary Park club.

His next move, in November 1991, was to Aberdeen. In four years with the Dons he made 141 total appearances, finding the net on 13 occasions. He played in three major cup semi-finals, losing two and beating former club Hibs in the other (in the 1992–93 Scottish Cup), but was then not selected for the final. After a loan spell at Barnsley, Kane joined Norwegian club Viking in 1996 under the Bosman ruling. He became the first British footballer to move under freedom of contract without incurring a transfer fee.

In 1997, Kane returned to Scotland to join St Johnstone, playing in the Scottish Premier League until the age of 36. In five years with the Saints, he made 138 league appearances and scored six goals. His final club was Clyde, who he played for from 2002 until his retirement twelve months later.

After retirement
Since retiring from football, Kane has been running a pub business, while attending Hibernian games regularly.

See also
 List of footballers in Scotland by number of league appearances (500+)
 List of Hibernian F.C. players

References

External links 
 
 

1965 births
Aberdeen F.C. players
Barnsley F.C. players
Clyde F.C. players
Expatriate footballers in Norway
Association football midfielders
Hibernian F.C. players
Living people
Eliteserien players
Oldham Athletic A.F.C. players
Footballers from Edinburgh
Scottish expatriate footballers
Scottish expatriate sportspeople in Norway
Scottish Football League players
Scottish footballers
Scottish Premier League players
St Johnstone F.C. players
Viking FK players